The Tamil Methodist Church is a church in Melaka City, Melaka, Malaysia.

History
The church was built in 1908 and initially known as Kubu Methodist Church. As the congregation grew bigger, space became an issue. In 1954, the Peranakans and English-speaking expatriates built a new church at Tengkera Street. In 1955, Mandarin-speaking Methodist moved to their own church at Tan Chay Yan Street, leaving the church to become the spiritual home for Tamil and English-speaking congregation.

See also
List of tourist attractions in Melaka
Christianity in Malaysia

References

Buildings and structures in Malacca City
Churches in Malacca